The Yên Thế Insurrection was a 25-year-long popular revolt in Yên Thế District, Vietnam, against French rule and in defiance of the Nguyễn dynasty's collaborative stance.

The revolt was led by the "Tiger of Yên Thế", Đề Thám, lasting some two decades (1887–1913). The rebellion was violent with intervals of truce when the French colonial authorities settled for peace, ceding four cantons to Đề Thám's control.

The policy of appeasement and containment was chosen after several military campaigns sweeping through the mountainous terrain to defeat Đề Thám failed to stomp out the resistance. Đề Thám variously resorted to guerrilla warfare, harassing local patrols, and at other times launching full attacks on French colonial forces.

The insurrection collapsed with the murder of Đề Thám in 1913 by an agent working for the French. The surviving forces were scattered, ending one of the longest chapters of anti-French resistance in pre-modern Vietnam.

References 

 

1880s in Vietnam
1890s in Vietnam
1900s in Vietnam
1910s in Vietnam
1880s conflicts
1890s conflicts
1900s conflicts
1910s conflicts
19th-century rebellions
20th-century rebellions
Wars involving Vietnam
Rebellions in Vietnam